Pseudoplatystoma fasciatum or barred sorubim or barred catfish is a species of long-whiskered catfish native to the Suriname, Corantijn and Essequibo. The nocturnal predator feeds mainly on other fish and crabs. Females reach a more notable size. Fecundity seems to be estimated at 8 million eggs per kg, but was recently measured in aquaculture at a lower, and more likely number of 150,000 eggs laid per kg.

Subspecies

According to Riehl and Haensch, five subspecies have been described:
 P. f. brevifile  Eigenmann & Eigenmann, 1882
 P. f. fasciatum  Linnaeus, 1766
 P. f.  intermedium  Eigenmann & Eigenmann, 1888
 P. f. nigricans  Eigenmann & Eigenmann, 1889
 P. f. reticulatum  Eigenmann & Eigenmann, 1889

However, Buitrago–Suárez and Burr place P. f. brevifile, P. f. intermedium, and P. f. nigricans, in the synonymy of P. punctifer. P. f. reticulatum is elevated as another distinct species P. reticulatum.

Previously, all subspecies except P. f. reticulatum were considered synonyms of P. fasciatum.

Reproduction and rearing

The species is of interest for aquaculture for food production (and indirectly as conservation measure because it may lower the fishing pressure on wild population), as well as for production of fish.
Maturation in earthen tanks of fish caught in the wild is not problematic, since manipulation of fish during fishing and transportation is well done.
Reproduction may be obtained with two injections of Ovaprim® in 24 hours (10% and 90% of the recommended dosis, respectively), ovulation occurs after around 8 hr at 27 °C. Incubation of eggs is carried out in "Zug" jars and hatching occurs 24 hours after fertilization at 26,5 °C. Vitelus resorption takes 3 days but larvae start feeding 2 days after hatching, and may start active cannibalism at this moment. Feeding may start 48 hours post-hatching with freshly hatched artemia nauplii, seven times a day. Larvae must be kept in the dark in order to maximize uniform distribution of larvae in the tanks and therefore food availability. After 15 days, food may be completed and then replaced gradually with ground mammalian liver. After 20 days post hatching, fingerling may be fed high quality pelleted food adapted to their size.

References 

Pimelodidae
Fish described in 1766
Fish of French Guiana
Fish of Guyana
Fish of Suriname
Fish of Venezuela
Taxa named by Carl Linnaeus